"Stay the Night" is a song by English act Ghosts. It was released as a download on 26 February 2007 and as two limited edition 7"s, and a CD single on 19 March that year. The single peaked at #25 in the UK Singles Chart.

Track listings

Download #1

Download #2

7" blue vinyl

7" purple vinyl

CD

References

Ghosts (band) songs
2007 singles
2007 songs
Atlantic Records singles